Parisse  is a surname. People with that name include:

 Annie Parisse (born Anne Marie Cancelmi, 1975), American actor
 Clément Parisse (born 1993), French cross-country skier
 Sergio Parisse (born 1983), Italian rugby player
 Tony Parisse (191156), American baseball player

See also 
 Parise, a surname